Kuala Rajang is a state constituency in Sarawak, Malaysia, that has been represented in the Sarawak State Legislative Assembly from 1969 to 1991, from 2016 to present.

The state constituency was created in the 1968 redistribution and is mandated to return a single member to the Sarawak State Legislative Assembly under the first past the post voting system.

History
It was abolished in 1991 after it was redistributed. It was re-created in 2015.

2016–present: The constituency contains the polling districts of Selalang, Belawai, Rajang, Sari, Seberang, Nanga Lepa.

Representation history

Election results

References

Sarawak state constituencies